Richard Alexander Jales (3 April 1922 – July 2004) was an English professional football left back and left half who played in the Football League for Aldershot.

References 

1922 births
2004 deaths
Footballers from Chiswick
English footballers
Association football fullbacks
Association football wing halves
Bradford City A.F.C. players
Aldershot F.C. players
English Football League players
Brentford F.C. wartime guest players
Rye United F.C. players